Glencoe is a ghost town in Dodge County, Nebraska, United States.

History
A post office was established at Glencoe in 1871, and remained in operation until it was discontinued in 1896. The town was named for James Glenn, a pioneer settler who served as postmaster.

References

Geography of Dodge County, Nebraska